Zervochoria is a former municipality in Chalkidiki, Greece. Since the 2011 local government reform it is part of the municipality Polygyros, of which it is a municipal unit. The municipal unit has an area of 139.526 km2. Population 2,378 (2011). The seat of the municipality was in Palaiochora.

References

Populated places in Chalkidiki